This is a complete list of seasons competed by the Calgary Stampeders, a Canadian Football League team.  The team was founded in 1945. Throughout their history, the Stampeders have won eight Grey Cups.

See also
List of Calgary Bronks (football) seasons

Calgary Stampeders lists